Generator X (established 1998 in Oslo) is a Norwegian Jazz band initiated by Audun Kleive. Most of the tracks for their first album were conceived live, during the band’s first sessions together, retaining the spontaneity of the genre. Framework is a metal/electronica composition, energetic and alarmingly intense. Mainstay or Obelisk are more contained, evolving slowly, following the strolls of the musicians, obviously at ease with each other, holding the convulsions, slowing down the pace, changing tempo, almost grounding the machinery to a complete halt at a few occasions, avoiding a premature climax. The symbiosis is perfect, almost palpable.

Ohmagoddabl (2003) are mixed in Bill Laswell's Turteltone Studios, New York.

Band members 
Current members
Christian Wallumrød - keyboards
Ole Morten Vågan - bass guitar
Audun Kleive - Drums

Former members
Jan Bang - samples
Geir Østensjø - Sound Design
Ståle Storløkken - synthesizer
Arve Henriksen - trumpet

Discography 
2000: Generator X (Jazzland Recordings)
2004: Ohmagoddabl (Jazzland Recordings)
2012: Attack (POL-selection)

References

External links
Audun Kleive Official Website

Norwegian jazz ensembles
Norwegian experimental musical groups
Musical groups established in 1998
Musical groups from Oslo